Álvaro López Ratón (born 29 January 1993) is a Spanish footballer who plays for Real Zaragoza as a goalkeeper.

Club career
Born in O Carballiño, Ourense, Galicia, Ratón joined Valencia CF's youth setup in 2007, aged 13, after spells at CD Arenteiro and Pabellón CF. He subsequently represented Deportivo de La Coruña and Montañeros CF as a youth, before signing for Arroyo CP in 2012.

After making no appearances for Arroyo, Ratón left the club in December 2012 and moved to Algeciras CF in Tercera División. He made his senior debut on 10 February 2013, starting in a 2–0 home win against CD Alcalá.

Ratón joined Real Betis' reserve team also in the fourth level in June 2013, after impressing on a trial. After being rarely used, he signed with CF Villanovense on 17 July 2014.

On 12 June 2015 Ratón moved to another reserve team, Real Zaragoza B in the fourth division. On 15 July of the following year, after being an undisputed starter, he renewed his contract until 2019 and was definitely promoted to the first team.

Ratón made his professional debut on 7 September, starting in a 1–2 Copa del Rey home loss against Real Valladolid. He made his Segunda División debut on 23 October, playing the full 90 minutes in a 0–0 away draw against the same opponent.

References

External links

Álvaro Ratón profile at La Preferente 

1993 births
Living people
People from O Carballiño (comarca)
Sportspeople from the Province of Ourense
Spanish footballers
Footballers from Galicia (Spain)
Association football goalkeepers
Segunda División players
Segunda División B players
Tercera División players
Algeciras CF footballers
Betis Deportivo Balompié footballers
CF Villanovense players
Real Zaragoza B players
Real Zaragoza players